Iliya Nikolov (born 14 July 1986) is a Bulgarian footballer, who plays as a goalkeeper for Maritsa Plovdiv.  He is also acting as goalkeeping coach.

Career
Nikolov started his career in his home town Haskovo in the local team FC Haskovo, before signing with Litex Lovech. He then played for two seasons on loan at Svilengrad and then Spartak Plovdiv, before terminating his Litex contract by mutual consent to move to Botev Plovdiv.

Honours

Club
Cherno More
 Bulgarian Cup: 2014–15

References

1986 births
Living people
People from Haskovo
Bulgarian footballers
First Professional Football League (Bulgaria) players
Second Professional Football League (Bulgaria) players
FC Haskovo players
PFC Litex Lovech players
PFC Spartak Varna players
FC Spartak Plovdiv players
Botev Plovdiv players
PFC Nesebar players
PFC Cherno More Varna players
FC Maritsa Plovdiv players
Association football goalkeepers
Sportspeople from Haskovo Province
21st-century Bulgarian people